West Adelaide Bearcats is a NBL1 Central club based in Adelaide, South Australia. The club fields both a men's and women's team. The club is a division of the overarching West Adelaide Basketball Club (WABC), the major administrative basketball organisation in Adelaide's western suburbs. The Bearcats play their home games at Port Adelaide Recreation Centre.

Club history

Background
The West Adelaide Basketball Club commenced in name in 1951 as a progression of the Kingston Basketball Club, which was established in 1946. The 'Bearcat' name was taken because of a close association with the University of Cincinnati in the United States.

After winning four early men's premierships in 1948, 1949, 1951 and 1952, West Adelaide entered both a men's and women's team into the first official SA State League season in 1957.

SA State League
Between 1967 and 1996, the Bearcats men contested 23 grand finals and won 14 titles. Then between 2001 and 2014, they were grand finalists four more times but failed to claim a 15th title in that time. The Bearcats women on the other hand contested 14 grand finals between 1968 and 1993 and won six titles. The women went on to contest grand finals in 2007 and 2010 as well, as they collected their seventh title in 2007 with a 77–57 win over Norwood in the championship decider. In 2017, the Bearcats men won their first Premier League title since 1996. In 2022, the women's team won the NBL1 Central Grand Final to claim their first championship since 2007.

National competition
In 1979, the WABC entered their premier men's team into the National Basketball League (NBL) for the competition's inaugural season. The team enjoyed outstanding success during the early days of the NBL which included Grand Finals in 1980 and 1983, and an NBL Championship victory against the Geelong Cats in 1982. Bearcats Championship Coach Ken Richardson was the inaugural MVP of the NBL in 1979. During the 1982 regular season, West Adelaide finished first with a 21–5 record behind the play of Americans Leroy Loggins and NBL MVP Al Green. The team merged with the Adelaide 36ers at the end of the 1984 season to form one 'Adelaide' team in the NBL, with the Bearcats providing six players to the roster including Peter Ali, Ray Wood, David Spear and Mike McKay along with legendary NBL Coach Ken Cole and team manager Keith Woods.

In addition to a men's representative team in the NBL, the women's program was also a founding member of the historic Women's National Basketball League (WNBL) in 1981. The West Adelaide "Lady" Bearcats competed in the WNBL for 12 seasons (1981–1992). The 1984 season was the highlight of their tenure as they claimed the minor premiership and contested the 1984 WNBL Grand Final, where they lost 78–65 to the Nunawading Spectres.

During the teams' time in the NBL and WNBL, both men's and women's sides continued to compete in the SA State League. West Adelaide won four straight men's state league championships between 1979 and 1982, while the women won three championships between 1983 and 1992.

NBL honour roll

NBL Season by season

1982 NBL Championship team

 Coach: Ken Richardson

References

External links
WABC's official website

Premier League (Australia) teams
Defunct National Basketball League (Australia) teams
Basketball clubs in Adelaide
Basketball teams established in 1957
1957 establishments in Australia